The 2018 2. divisjon (referred to as PostNord-ligaen for sponsorship reasons) was a Norwegian football third-tier league season. The league consisted of 28 teams divided into 2 groups of 14 teams.

The league was played as a double round-robin tournament, where all teams played 26 matches.

Team changes
The following teams changed division since the 2017 season.

To 2. divisjon
Promoted from 3. divisjon
 Moss
 Stabæk 2
 Fløy
 Brattvåg
 Stjørdals-Blink
 Mjølner

Relegated from 1. divisjon
 Fredrikstad
 Elverum
 Arendal

From 2. divisjon
Promoted to 1. divisjon
 HamKam
 Nest-Sotra
 Notodden

Relegated to 3. divisjon
 Finnsnes
 Brumunddal 
 Follo
 Vindbjart
 Fana
 Byåsen

League tables

Group 1

Group 2

Promotion play-offs

The teams who finished in second place in their respective group qualified for the promotion play-offs, where they faced each other over two legs. The winner, KFUM Oslo, then played against the 14th placed team in 1. divisjon for a place in the 2019 1. divisjon.

KFUM Oslo won 4–1 on aggregate.

Top scorers

Group 1

Group 2

References

Norwegian Second Division seasons
3
Norway
Norway